Aporphine is an alkaloid with the chemical formula . The IUPAC (International Union of Pure and Applied Chemistry) name of aporphine is 6-methyl-5,6,6a,7-tetrahydro-4H-dibenzo[de,g]quinoline. It is the core chemical substructure of the aporphine alkaloids, a subclass of quinoline alkaloids. It can exist in either of two enantiomeric forms, (R)-aporphine and (S)-aporphine.

Derivatives
Many different derivatives have been isolated from plants. For example, many water-lilies (Nymphaea species) produce aporphine alkaloids such as nymphaeine, nymphaline, nupharine, α- and β-nupharidine.

In vitro tests of some aporphine derivatives isolated from Cassytha filiformis, namely actinodaphnine, cassythine, and dicentrine, showed antiparasitic activity against Trypanosoma brucei. Investigation of possible mechanisms revealed that the compounds bind to DNA and act as intercalating agents, besides inhibiting topoisomerase activity.

Aporphine natural products occur with either the (R)- or (S)-stereochemistries, or they can be achiral. Furthermore, morphine-based natural products can be heated in acid to give aporphine degradation products, like the FDA-approved Parkinson's drug apomorphine, which was first discovered by the Finnish chemist Arppe in 1845.

Apomorphine 
A specific type of aporphine is apomorphine. The compound is historically a morphine decomposition product made by boiling morphine with concentrated acid, hence the -morphine suffix. Contrary to its name however, apomorphine doesn’t actually contain morphine or its skeleton, nor does it bind to opioid receptors. The apo- prefix indicates that it is a morphine derivative.

Historically, apomorphine has been tried for a variety of uses, including as a way to relieve anxiety and craving in alcoholics, an emetic (a vomit-inducer), for treating stereotypies (repeated behaviour) in farmyard animals, and more recently in treating erectile dysfunction. It was also used as a private treatment of heroin addiction, but there is no clinical evidence that it is an effective and safe treatment for opiate addiction however.

Currently, apomorphine is used in the treatment of Parkinson’s disease. It is a potent emetic and should not be administered without an antiemetic such as domperidone. The emetic properties of apomorphine are exploited in veterinary medicine to induce therapeutic emesis (vomiting) in canines that have recently ingested toxic or foreign substances.

Effects 
Aporphine is a dopamine receptor agonist, specifically D1 and D2. In rodents, apomorphine administration has been demonstrated to activate gene expression specifically in the nuclei of the hypothalamus, resulting in stereotypical behaviour of erection and yawning. In humans, apomorphine produces nonsexual erections that are enhanced by erotic stimulation without changes in libido (sexual desire), but significant side effects (especially nausea) can occur. A sublingual (under the tongue) formulation of apomorphine (2 and 4 mg) with a rapid onset of action (15 to 25 min) has been developed and proven to be efficacious in ED (erectile dysfunction) patients with controlled diabetes, hypertension (high blood pressure), benign prostatic hypertrophy (the non-harmful enlargement of the prostate from the increase in size of its cells) or coronary vascular disease (disease of the arteries surrounding and supplying the heart).

Synthesis 
Aporphine can be synthesized in a seven-step reaction. First, 1-Benzyl-2-tosyl-1,2,3,4-tetrahydroisoquinolin-7-ylpyridine-2-sulfonate is converted to 6-Tosyl-5,6,6a,7-tetrahydro-4H-dibenzo[de,g]quinolin-1-yl-pyridine-2-sulfonate via an aryl-aryl dehydrogenative coupling reaction. Then, 6-Tosyl-5,6,6a,7-tetrahydro-4H-dibenzo[de,g]quinolin-1-yl-pyridine-2-sulfonate is reacted to 6-Tosyl-5,6,6a,7-tetrahydro-4H-dibenzo[de,g]quinolin-1-ol in a reduction reaction. After this second step, 6-Tosyl-5,6,6a,7-tetrahydro-4H-dibenzo[de,g]quinolin-1-yl Trifluoromethanesulfonate is created by swapping the hydroxyl group of 6-Tosyl-5,6,6a,7-tetrahydro-4H-dibenzo[de,g]quinolin-1-ol for a trifluoromethanesulfonate group. This 6-Tosyl-5,6,6a,7-tetrahydro-4H-dibenzo[de,g]quinolin-1-yl Trifluoromethanesulfonate is then further reduced by palladium acetate, leading to 6-Tosyl-5,6,6a,7-tetrahydro-4H-dibenzo[de,g]quinolone. The sixth step is conversion of 6-Tosyl-5,6,6a,7-tetrahydro-4H-dibenzo[de,g]quinolone to 5,6,6a,7-Tetrahydro-4H-dibenzo[de,g]quinolone in reduction reaction using samarium(II)iodide. The seventh and final step is the reductive amination of 5,6,6a,7-Tetrahydro-4H-dibenzo[de,g]quinolone to yield aporphine.

A number of natural products semisynthetic analogs belonging to the aporphine class have been synthesized. These include apomorphine by Neumeyer and Raminelli, Pukateine by Happel, Isocorydine by Di, Nuciferine and Oliveroline by Cuny, Glaucine by Meyers, Dicentrine by Cava, and Lysicamine by Raminelli, and an overview of some of the synthetic approaches toward the aporphine ring system is outlined in the figure at the right.

Toxicity 
Most aporphine alkaloids are toxic. They exhibit antagonistic effects to dopamine. Many of them have anticonvulsant activity or induced convulsions in animals and cytotoxic (toxic to cells) activity.

Some aporphine alkaloids (such as crebanine) have been found to present arrhythmic activity (irregularities in the heartbeat) and also higher toxicity. In a study, a couple of target derivatives were evaluated for their antiarrhythmic potential in the mouse model of ventricular fibrillation (VF, a dangerous type of arrhythmia). Here, preliminary structure-activity/toxicity relationship analyses were carried out. Of these target derivatives, a certain bromo-substituted product of crebanine displayed significant antiarrhythmic activity and a lower toxicity. In a significant number of rats, this product caused reduction in the incidence of VF, increase in the resumption of sinus rhythm (normal heartbeat) from arrhythmia, and increase in maintaining sinus rhythm. This indicates that this specific aporphine alkaloid could be considered as a promising candidate in the treatment of arrhythmia.

Pharmacology
According to the U.S. Patent & Trademark Office, aporphine derivatives can be used for treating oxidative stress induced diseases. Aporphine that can inhibit lipid peroxidase and perform the free radical scavenging activities cause protection of blood vessel smooth muscle cells. This reduces oxidative stress which may induce diseases such as cardiovascular disease, Alzheimer’s disease, kidney disease, diabetes, cancer etc.

Aporphine alkaloids present in Litsea glutinosa, a tropical plant with antioxidant and anti-parasitic properties, claims to contribute to anti-cancer activity. The study of Chi P. Ndi et al., (2016) illustrates the antiproliferative and cytotoxic effects of aporphine-containing extracts of Litsea glutinosa. In silico measurements show that the 1,2-methylenedioxy group of aporphine can be utilized in the same manner as the anticancer drug etoposide.

(R)-Aporphine is a dopamine receptor D1 antagonist with a Ki of 717 nM and a dopamine receptor D2 antagonist with a Ki of 527 nM. Aporphine and its related alkaloids bulbocapnine, boldine, glaucine, and corytuberine are antipsychotic, exert naloxone-reversible antinociceptive activity, and with the exception of corytuberine are anticonvulsant. Some derivatives of aporphine such as (S)-(+)-N-propylnorapomorphine have potential as low side effect profile antipsychotics. (S)-(+)-N-Propylnorapomorphine is highly selective for meso-limbic dopaminergic tracts and function as efficacious partial agonists, with no elevation in prolactin.

Pharmacokinetics
Aporphine is hydroxylated in the body to form apomorphine.

Psychoactive effects 
The Nymphea species (Nymphaea caerulea), as mentioned in ‘Derivatives’, is commonly used in society. Its plant extracts can be ingested, vaped or injected. Intake of Nymphaea at high doses is known to produce euphoria and hallucinations. This plant, also called the blue lotus, is sold in several forms such as dried plant material, teas, or as extract for electronic cigarettes. The psychoactive effect of the flower is due to two aporphine alkaloids; apomorphine and nuciferine. Apomorphine is known to treat diseases such as depression, schizophrenia, Parkison’s disease and erectile dysfunction. Nuciferine is used as an antipsychotic and in treatment of alcohol use disorder. The compound has mixed effects at serotonin and dopamine receptors causing the compound to be a dopaminergic agonist (it acts the same as dopamine).

Effects on animals 
There are no studies on aporphine specifically in animals. Studies on subcutaneous apomorphine injection are the closest thing as apomorphine is the bioactive form of aporphine. In a 5-day study, mice were given up to 10 mg/kg apomorphine subcutaneously daily. No adverse effects were observed other than a slight increase in dopamine levels. However, apomorphine is used in veterinary clinics as an emetic, due to severe off-target effects that lead to vomiting.

In another study, mice were given a single 40 mg/kg dose of apomorphine. Slight DNA damage was observed in brain tissue three hours after treatment.

See also 
Anonaine
Liriodenine
Magnoflorine
Nantenine
Nuciferine

References